Moni Tongaʻuiha (born 5 October 1994) is a United States rugby union player, currently playing for the New Orleans Gold of Major League Rugby (MLR) and the United States national team. His preferred position is flanker.

Professional career
Tongaʻuiha signed for Major League Rugby side New Orleans Gold for the 2021 Major League Rugby season, having represented the side since 2018.

Tongaʻuiha debuted for United States against Canada during the 2023 Rugby World Cup – Americas qualification.

References

External links
itsrugby.co.uk Profile

1994 births
Living people
United States international rugby union players
New Orleans Gold players
Rugby union flankers
People from Oakland, California
American rugby union players